"Man vs technology" is a type of conflict in fiction, of which The Terminator and The Matrix are popular examples.

See also
Conflict (narrative) for a list of narrative conflicts.

References

Conflict (narrative)